Anushirvan (Middle Persian: Anōšagruwān, Anūšīrvān) or Nushirvan may refer to:

People
 Khosrow I  (501–579), known as Anushirvan, Sasanian king
 Anushirvan Sharaf al-Ma'ali (1030–1050), Ziyarid king
 Anushirvan ibn Lashkari, Shaddadid ruler (1049)
 Anushirwan, Ilkhan khanate (died 1356)
 Husain Shah Chak (1563–1570), Chak Sultan, was popularly known as Nushirvan of Kashmir
 Darashaw Nosherwan Wadia (1883–1969), Indian geologist
 Jamsetji Nusserwanji Tata (1839–1904), Indian industrialist, founder of the Tata Group and Jamshedpur
 Dara Nusserwanji Khurody (1906–1983), Indian dairy entrepreneur
Yazdi Naoshriwan Karanjia (born 1937), Indian theatre personality

Places in Iran
 Anushirvan, Iran, a village in North Khorasan Province, Iran
 Anushirvan, Kermanshah, a village in Kermanshah Province, Iran
 Anushirvan, Sistan and Baluchestan, a village in Sistan and Baluchestan Province, Iran

See also
 Nausherwan-E-Adil, 1957 Indian film
 Nosherwan (disambiguation)